Grefsen is a neighbourhood in the city of Oslo, Norway.

Grefsen was a part of the municipality of Aker before the Second World War, later incorporated into Oslo. Together with Kjelsås, Grefsen then formed the borough Grefsen-Kjelsås until 1 January 2004, when they became part of the new borough of Nordre Aker.

The Gjøvik Railway Line goes through the area, but Grefsen Station is actually located closer to the neighbourhood of Disen. The Kjelsås Tram Line also runs through the area. The local sports field Grefsen stadion is the home field of Kjelsås IL.

There are four schools in the area, Grefsen Elementary School (year 1-7), Engebråten Middle School (year 8-10), Morellbakken Middle School (year 8-10) and Nydalen High School (year 11-13). Nydalen High School used to be Grefsen High School until 2014, when it was renovated and changed name.

Grefsen Church (Grefsen kirke) was consecrated in 1940.

The name
The neighbourhood is named after the old farm Grefsen (Norse , from ). The first element is  'steep hillside' (derived from the verb  'dig (out)'), the last element is  f 'meadow'. The old farm had Akerselva as its western border, and the hillside/riverside down to the river is very steep. The adjacent hill Grefsenåsen is named after the farm.

Notable people
Peter Andreas Morell, campaigned for better education for Grefsen
Jon Øigarden, Norwegian Actor grew up in Grefsen

References

Neighbourhoods of Oslo